Greensleeves Rhythm Album is a series of various artists compilation albums released by Greensleeves Records. Each volume of the series features tracks from multiple artists recorded over one or two reggae or dancehall riddims produced by various producers. The series began in February 2000 with the release of the Bellyas riddim album as a way of collecting various artists' 7 inch recordings on a single CD or vinyl record. Greensleeves has since released 90 installments in the series, making it one of the longest running reggae record compilation series. VP Records has a similar series of compilation albums, known as Riddim Driven.

Greensleeves Rhythm Album discography

2000
 #1: Bellyas 
 #2: Virus 
 #3: Doorslam 
 #4: Volume 
 #5: Punanny 
 #6: Latino / Boasy Gal 
 #7: Lightning 
 #8: Highway

2001
 #9: Heatwave 
 #10: Tixx / Blaze 
 #11: Mud-Up 
 #12: X-Treme 
 #13: Double Jeopardy 
 #14: Drop-Top / Di Nipples 
 #15: Bushy Bushy 
 #16: Saddam Birthday Party / Jailbreak 
 #17: Herbalist / Energy 
 #18: Bun Bun 
 #19: Bigga Judgement

2002
 #20: Time Bomb 
 #21: Bad Kalic 
 #22: Martial Arts Part 1 
 #23: Martial Arts Part 2 
 #24: Zero Tolerance 
 #25: Famine 
 #26: Hard Drive Part 1 
 #27: Diwali 
 #28: Hard Drive Part 2 
 #29: Sledge 
 #30: Bollywood 
 #31: Belly Skin 
 #32: Threat 
 #33: Mad Ants 
 #34: Masterpiece

2003
 #35: Clappas 
 #36: Knockout 
 #37: Krazy 
 #38: C-4 
 #39: Bad Company 
 #40: Egyptian 
 #41: 20 Cent 
 #42: Sign 
 #43: Jumbie 
 #44: Good To Go 
 #45: Coolie Dance 
 #46: Amharic 
 #47: Trifecta 
 #48: Tunda Klap

2004
 #49: French Vanilla 
 #50: Marmalade 
 #51: Red Alert! 
 #52: Blackout 
 #53: Worried 
 #54: Cool Fusion 
 #55: Blue Steel 
 #56: Mad Guitar 
 #57: Scoobay! 
 #58: Summer Bounce 
 #59: Kasablanca 
 #60: Spanish Fly 
 #61: Tighty Tighty 
 #62: Middle East 
 #63: Chicatita 
 #64: Klymaxx! 
 #65: Slow Bounce

2005
 #66: ..Bomb A Drop! 
 #67: Jonkanoo 
 #68: Fowl Fight! 
 #69: Sunblock 
 #70: Grimey 
 #71: Slingshot 
 #72: Bounce 
 #73: World Jam 
 #74: Madda' Dan 
 #75: Siren! 
 #76: Ice Cube 
 #77: Justice 
 #78: Jump Off!

2006
 #79: The Return of Mudd-Up 
 #80: Sweat 
 #81: Red Bull & Guinness 
 #82: Galore 
 #83: Petty Thief 
 #84: Twice Again 
 #85: Inspector 
 #86: Ghetto Whiskey

2008
 #87: Airwaves 
 #88: Warning

2009
 #89: Silent River

2010
 #90: Set Mi Free

Riddims